The 1924 Miami Redskins football team was an American football team that represented Miami University as a member of the Ohio Athletic Conference (OAC) during the 1924 college football season. In its first season under head coach Chester Pittser, Miami compiled a 2–6 record (1–5 against conference opponents) and finished in 19th place out of 20 teams in the OAC.

Schedule

References

Miami
Miami RedHawks football seasons
Miami Redskins football